The Nikon GP-1 is a Global Positioning System (GPS) accessory receiver manufactured by Nikon that collects geographic coordinate data and places it into the Exif data of a picture.  It connects to the camera via a proprietary cable and can be mounted on the flash shoe or on the camera strap.

Compatible cameras 
The GP-1 is compatible with:

Nikon COOLPIX P7700
Nikon D50
Nikon D90 via CA90-Kabel
Nikon D3100 via CA90-Kabel
Nikon D3200
Nikon D3300
Nikon D5000 via CA90-Kabel
Nikon D5100 via CA90-Kabel
Nikon D5200
Nikon D5300
Nikon D5500
Nikon D7000 via CA90-Kabel
Nikon D7100
Nikon D7200
Nikon D200
Nikon D300
Nikon D300s
Nikon D500
Nikon D600
Nikon D610
Nikon D700
Nikon D750
Nikon D800
Nikon D800E
Nikon D810
Nikon D2Hs
Nikon D2X
Nikon D2Xs
Nikon D3
Nikon D3s
Nikon D3X
Nikon D4
Nikon D4S
Nikon D5
Nikon Df

See also 
Nikon GP-N100

External links 

Nikon GP-1 product information

GP-1